In mathematics, a Nekrasov matrix or generalised Nekrasov matrix is a type of diagonally dominant matrix (i.e. one in which the diagonal elements are in some way greater than some function of the non-diagonal elements). Specifically if A is a generalised Nekrasov matrix, its diagonal elements are non-zero and the diagonal elements also satisfy,

where,
.

References

Matrices